Laganas is a village and a former municipality on the island of Zakynthos, Ionian Islands, Greece. Since the 2011 local government reform it is part of the municipality Zakynthos, of which it is a municipal unit. The municipal unit Laganas covers the southernmost part of Zakynthos. Its municipal seat was the town of Pantokratoras (pop. 925 in 2011). The municipal unit of Laganas has a land area of 74.104 km². Its largest towns are Mouzaki (pop. 1,702), Lithakia (pop. 1,307), Pantokratoras, Kalamaki (pop. 890), Laganas (pop. 729), and Keri (pop. 469). The central and eastern part of the municipal unit are flat, but there are hills up to 450 m elevation in the west. The Zakynthos International Airport lies in the eastern part of the municipal unit, near Kalamaki. The beach village Laganas, part of the community of Pantokratoras, is on the southeastern coast. A large part of Laganas is a national park, established for the protection of turtles.

History
The name "Laganas" comes from the Greek word "lagini" meaning "jug", referring to the former manufacture of pottery in the area of Lithakia and Kalamaki. Laganas suffered great damage from the 1953 Ionian earthquake.

Population

Laganas attractions

An attraction of Laganas is the migration of the loggerhead sea turtles (Caretta caretta). Each year during the months of June, July and August the turtles migrate to the Bay of Laganas to lay their eggs on the beach. This is a protected beach which is watched over by ecologists at all times.

Laganas is a party destination in Europe for 18-30s visitors. The town has many nightclubs, restaurants and local souvenir shops. Laganas is popular among young British, Serbian, Dutch, Swedish and German tourists.. Laganas is home to over 100 bars and clubs and is busiest during the summer months of June, July & August.

Subdivisions
The municipal unit Laganas is subdivided into the following communities (constituent villages in brackets):
Agalas (Agalas, Ai Giannis, Ampelos, Stimies)
Kalamaki (Kalamaki, Margaraiika, Pefkakia)
Keri (Keri, Apelati, Limni Keriou, Marathias)
Lithakia
Mouzaki
Pantokratoras (Pantokratoras, Laganas)

See also
List of settlements in Zakynthos

References

External links
Laganas (municipality) on GTP Travel Pages

Populated places in Zakynthos